Jess is a novel by British writer H. Rider Haggard, set in South Africa.

Background
Haggard wrote the book in 1885, primarily in his chambers where he was working as a barrister. King Solomon's Mines had been an enormous success but Haggard says he had been "somewhat piqued by the frequent descriptions of myself as 'a mere writer of romances and boys’ books'". The book is named after Jess, one of the two orphaned nieces of a farmer in the Transvaal.

Reception
The book was highly successful.

Adaptations
The book was filmed in 1912, 1914, and 1917 (as Heart and Soul starring Theda Bara in the title role).

References

External links
Complete book at Project Gutenberg
Images and bibliographic information for various editions of Jess at SouthAfricaBooks.com

Novels by H. Rider Haggard
British adventure novels
1887 British novels
British novels adapted into films
Novels set in South Africa